Locro (from the Quechua ruqru) is a hearty thick squash stew, associated with Native Andean civilizations, and popular along the Andes mountain range. It is one of the national dishes of Peru, Bolivia, Ecuador, Chile, Paraguay, Northwest Argentina and Southwestern Colombia.

Composition 
The dish is a classic squash, corn, beans, and potato or pumpkin soup well known along the South American Andes. In some regions locro is made using a specific kind of potato called "papa chola", which has a unique taste and is difficult to find outside of its home region.

The defining ingredients are squash, corn, some form of meat (usually beef, but sometimes beef jerky or chorizo), and vegetables. Other ingredients vary widely, and typically include onion, beans, squash or pumpkin. It is mainly eaten in winter.

In Ecuador, a variant known as yahuarlocro is popular. It incorporates lamb entrails and lamb blood to the recipe.

In Argentina its consumption has spread from the Northwest and Cuyo to the rest of the country. In the Argentine province of Neuquén, in addition to locro made with corn, a kind of locro is prepared with peas, and in the Northeast of Argentina locro is also prepared on the basis of cassava.

Although the Argentine locro has Indo-American origins, its preparation in Argentina for at least three centuries synthesizes the European gastronomic contributions: for example, pork, chorizos, ‘mondongo’ and numerous seasonings have been contributed by the Europeans (especially by the Spanish).

There are several classic types of locro: corn, beans, cassava and wheat, although an expert cook can make an excellent synthesis of two or more of these types of locro to include all the ingredients.

Thus, the Argentine locro is prepared according to a multitude of recipes, the only invariable thing being its vegetable base and the cooking procedure, over low heat for several hours. According to the region, it is prepared with fresh or dried beef ‘charqui’, offal such as tripa gorda or chinchulín, mondongo, sausages and pork ribs or offal (hands, feet, tail, ears and hide, bacon, fat); the meats are cooked separately and then added to the preparation of vegetables among which usually stand out the pumpkin (especially the round one of grayish skin called for this reason zapallo plomo), which usually gives its yellow color to the locro, and white corn grains, beans and even wheat grains -in Argentina locro with white corn grains is preferred and the locro based on crushed corn grains is called frangollo-, vegetables that due to the starch present in its components make the preparation reach the density of a cream. It is a hearty and nutritious dish typical of winter. It is seasoned accordingly, with a spicy sauce prepared with oil (or fat), ground chili, paprika, green onion and salt, called quiquirimichi.

The succulent locro (dense and with varied and abundant ingredients) usually receives the name of locro pulsudo; on the other hand, it is called huaschalocro, that is to say "poor locro" without meat or huascha locro (from Quechua: wakcha luqru), to the "light" locro prepared with the minimum of ingredients and with a thick sticky consistency. A gastronomic variety close to huaschalocro is mote.

It is also called "pulsudo" in Argentina to the locro that besides being substantial and full of calories is very spicy, like the locro with cumbarí bell pepper as it happens in certain zones of the Argentine Northwest and especially in certain zones of the Argentine province of La Rioja.3

Locro casserole is a food with many calories and nutrients, locro is very suitable for consumption during winters or in cold areas. It is traditionally consumed on a massive scale on May 1st and May 25th, the day that commemorates the May Revolution and the formation of the first Argentine patriotic government, which was established on May 25, 1810. For this reason, it has gone from being a regional and traditional dish to being one of Argentina's national dishes to celebrate patriotic dates: on the two Argentine patriotic dates - May 25th, date of the de facto or concrete independence of Argentina since 1810, and July 9th, date on which, in 1816 in San Miguel de Tucumán, Argentina's independence was explicitly proclaimed. The breakfast of chocolate infusions with milk and pastries given in schools on May 25th and July 9th is usually traditional, as opposed to the also traditional mate cocido, which is usually given during most of each year in public schools, military barracks and regiments, etc., accompanied by pastelitos criollos. Eventually there is the custom of inviting guests with small casseroles of locro at wedding celebrations.

On cold days, adults have as an excellent companion to a hot locro a good red wine such as Argentine malbec, and if the locro is consumed on warm days, a fresh and fruity honeyed Argentine torrontés white wine is preferable.

According to authorized authors such as Victor Ego Ducrot, the Argentine locro became one of the Argentine national dishes during the Argentine War of Independence, and especially in the Gaucho War, when the gauchos who had fought in the ranks of the Army of the North then spread the typical stew of the Argentine Northwest in Argentina pampeana, litoral, cuyana, etcetera; In the Centenary of the Revolution of May, that is to say on May 25th, 1910, practically (although no legislation is known in this respect) locro was made official as national food in the two main patriotic dates. 4 5

Translated with www.DeepL.com/Translator (free version)

Gallery

See also

 List of Ecuadorian dishes and foods
 List of stews

References 

Argentine cuisine
Bolivian cuisine
Chilean cuisine
Ecuadorian cuisine
Paraguayan cuisine
Peruvian cuisine
Stews
Offal
National symbols of Argentina
National dishes